It's On Tonight is the eighth studio album by American keyboardist Brian Culbertson. It was released by GRP Records on July 26, 2005. The album reached the top of the US Billboard Contemporary Jazz Albums chart and number two on Billboards Top Jazz Albums chart.

Overview
Artists such as Kirk Whalum, Chris Botti, Boney James, Patti Austin, Will Downing and Marc Nelson featured on the album.

Tracklisting

Charts

References

2005 albums
GRP Records albums